This list shows the employment in agriculture (as percentage of total employment) of various countries.

References

Employment,countries